Tyrone Pillay is a South African Paralympic athlete. He represented South Africa at the 2016 Summer Paralympics in Rio de Janeiro, Brazil and he won the bronze medal in the men's shot put F42 event.

Career 

At the 2015 African Games held in Brazzaville, Republic of the Congo, he won the gold medal in the men's shot put F42 event.

At the 2019 World Para Athletics Championships held in Dubai, United Arab Emirates, he competed in the men's shot put F63 event where he finished in 7th place.

Achievements

References

External links 
 

Living people
Year of birth missing (living people)
Place of birth missing (living people)
South African amputees
South African male shot putters
Athletes (track and field) at the 2016 Summer Paralympics
Medalists at the 2016 Summer Paralympics
Paralympic bronze medalists for South Africa
Paralympic medalists in athletics (track and field)
Paralympic athletes of South Africa
Athletes (track and field) at the 2015 African Games
African Games competitors for South Africa